Mamesh Khan (also Romanized as Mamesh Khān) is a village in Sokmanabad Rural District, Safayyeh District, Khoy County, West Azerbaijan Province, Iran. At the 2006 census, its population was 261, in 54 families.

References 

Populated places in Khoy County